Sam Polo (November 7, 1872 –  October 3, 1966) was an American make up artist and actor of the silent movies era known for The Lion's Claws (1918), The Great Circus Mystery (1925) and A Man from Nowhere (1920). He was the brother of Eddie Polo. 
 
He died in Woodland Hills, Los Angeles, California, and is buried at Inglewood Park Cemetery, Los Angeles, California.

Partial filmography
 The Lion's Claws (1918)
 The Midnight Man (1919)
 A Man from Nowhere (1920)
 The Bearcat (1922)
 The Great Circus Mystery (1925)
 The Fighting Ranger (1925)

References

External links

1872 births
1966 deaths
Male actors from California
20th-century American male actors
American male silent film actors